Mixed Beats is the second remix album by Ira Losco, the first one being   Blends & Remixes of Someone Else.

Track listing
"Something To Talk About" [U-Bahn Remix] – 3:57
"What's The Matter With Your Cabrio" [DJ Ruby Remix] – 5:27
"Love Song" [Tenishia Remix] - 4:47
"Your Ways" [Alvin Gee Remix] - 3.44
"Promises" [Miss Roberta Remix] - 5.03
"Idle Motion" [Toby Remix] - 4.31
"Accident Prone 2009" [DJ Ruby and Glenn Frantz Remix] - 4.55
"Shoulders Of Giants" [Roger Shah Magic Island Remix Radio Edit] - 4.30
"Driving One Of Your Cars" [DJ Ruby Remix] - 3.22
"Promises" [Duo Blank Remix] - 4.41
"Fortune Teller" [Glenn Frantz Reprise Remix] - 5.35
"Accident Prone 09" [Thomas Penton & Alex Armes Remix] - 5.21
"Shoulders Of Giants" [Roger Shah Magic Island Remix Club Mix] - 8.06

Ira Losco albums
2009 remix albums